Dorm of the Dead is a 2007 American horror film directed and written by Donald Farmer. It stars Jackey Hall, Ciara Richards and Adrianna Eder as college students who must survive a zombie attack.

Plot 
A professor returns to Arkham University with the blood of a zombie.  As he tests it on the students, Amy accidentally initiates a zombie attack.  During the confusion, bully Clare targets goths Sarah and Allison for involuntary conversion into zombies.

Cast
 Jackey Hall as Clare
 Andrea Brooke Ownbey as Julie
 Ciara Richards as Sarah
 Adrianna Eder as Allison
 Tiffany Shepis as Amy
 Dukey Flyswatter as Alf

Release 
Dorm of the Dead was released on home video September 18, 2007.

Reception 
Melissa Bostaph of Dread Central rated the film 1.5/5 stars and called it a "bullshit film" that had no effort put into it.  Brandon Ciampaglia of IGN rated the film 0/10 stars and wrote, "It is in our professional opinion that this catastrophe never be watched by anyone – ever."  Nick Lyons of DVD Talk rated the film 0.5/5 and called it an insult to the word film.  Mac McEntire of DVD Verdict described the film as "amateur hour" and technically incompetent.  Peter Dendle called it a "boring, amateurish production".

References

External links 
 

2007 films
2007 horror films
American independent films
American zombie films
Direct-to-video horror films
Lesbian-related films
2000s English-language films
2000s American films